Muricopsis (Muricopsis) hernandezi is a species of sea snail, a marine gastropod mollusk in the family Muricidae, the murex snails or rock snails.

The species occurs on the island of São Tomé.

References

Further reading
Rolán E. & Gori S. 2007. A new species of Muricopsis (Muricidae: Muricopsinae) from São Tomé Island. Novapex, 8(1): 23–26.

Muricidae
Fauna of São Tomé Island
Endemic fauna of São Tomé and Príncipe
Invertebrates of São Tomé and Príncipe
Gastropods described in 2007